Barthélemy Thimonnier (19 August 1793 in L'Arbresle, Rhône - 5 July 1857 in Amplepuis) was a French inventor, who is attributed with the invention of the first sewing machine that replicated sewing by hand. He was born in L'Arbresle, in Rhône in France.

Early life
In 1795, his family moved to Amplepuis. Thimonnier was the eldest of seven children. He studied for a while in Lyon, before going to work as a tailor in Panissières. Barthelemy Thimonnier married an embroideress in January 1822. In 1823, he settled in a suburb of Saint-Étienne and worked as a tailor there.

Invention of the sewing machine
Though the first sewing machine needle was patented by Charles Fredrick Wiesenthal in 1755, in 1829 Thimonnier reinvented the sewing machine. In 1830 he signed a contract with Auguste Ferrand, a mining engineer, who made the requisite drawings and submitted a patent application.  The patent for his machine was issued on 17 July 1830 in the names of both men, supported by the French government.  The same year, he opened (with partners) the first machine-based clothing manufacturing company in the world.  It was supposed to create army uniforms.  However, the factory was burned down, reportedly by workers fearful of losing work following the issuing of the patent.  (See also: Luddite)         

A model of the machine is exhibited at the London Science Museum. The machine is made of wood and uses a barbed needle which passes downward through the cloth to grab the thread and pull it up to form a loop to be locked by the next loop.

The earliest sewing machine was actually patented by Thomas Saint in 1790. So Thimonnier's machine was not the first. Saint's contribution was not made public until 1874 when William Newton Wilson, himself a sewing machine manufacturer, found the drawings in the London Patent Office and built a machine which worked following some adjustments to the looper. So, in 1790 Thomas Saint had invented a machine with an overhanging arm, a feed mechanism (adequate for the short lengths of leather he intended it for), a vertical needle bar and a looper. The London Science Museum has the model that Wilson built from Saint's drawings.

Later life
Thimonnier then returned to Amplepuis and supported himself as a tailor again, while searching for improvements to his machine.  He obtained new patents in 1841, 1845, and 1847 for new models of sewing machine.  However, despite having won prizes at World Fairs, and being praised by the press, use of the machine did not spread.  Thimonnier's financial situation remained difficult, and he died in poverty at the age of 63.

The Thimonnier sewing machine company, created after his death, existed up to the 20th century.

References

1793 births
1857 deaths
19th-century French inventors
People from L'Arbresle
Sewing machine brands